The 2019–20 Rugby Europe Women's Trophy was the 21st edition of Rugby Europe's second division competition for women's national rugby union teams.

Standings

Results

See also
 2019 Rugby Europe Women's Championship
 Rugby Europe Women's Championship
 Women's international rugby union § 2019

References

2019
2019 rugby union tournaments for national teams
Trophy
Rugby union in the Czech Republic
Rugby union in Finland
Rugby union in Sweden
Rugby union in Switzerland